or  is a private university in Kodaira, Western Tokyo, founded in 1962 with roots going back to 1929. It is known as one of the leading art universities in Japan.

History 
In October 1929,  was founded. In December 1948, it became , and in April 1962, it was renamed Musashino Art University.

From its start, the university taught fine art and industrial design; it later added architecture, fashion, and other fields.

MAU has exchange agreements with universities in other countries. It has a graduate school that awards master's degrees and doctorates.

People associated with Musashino Art University

Alumni 
 Michiyo Akaishi, manga artist
 Ume Aoki, manga artist
 Kei Aoyama, manga artist
 Shusaku Arakawa, artist and designer
 Tetsuo Araki, print artist
 Taku Aramasa, photographer
 Yahel Chirinian, sculptor and installation artist
 Hiroki Endo, manga artist
 Lily Franky, illustrator, writer, and actor
 Kenya Hara, graphic designer and art director of Muji
 Katsuhito Ishii, film director
 Koji Ishikawa, illustrator
 Paru Itagaki, manga artist
 Satoshi Itō (Project Itoh), science fiction writer
 Kazuo Kamimura, manga artist
 Miyuki Kobayashi, novelist and scenario writer for manga
 Satoshi Kon, anime director and manga artist
 Fusako Kuramochi, manga artist
 Tomoki Kyoda, anime director
 Junko Mori, artist and metalworker
 Ryū Murakami, novelist and filmmaker
 Joji Nagashima, automobile designer for BMW
 Yurie Nagashima, photographer
 Rei Naito, artist
 Tatzu Nishi, installation artist
 Shinro Ohtake, painter
 Rieko Saibara, manga artist
 Shiori Satō, idol and member of Keyakizaka46
 Shūhō Satō, manga artist
 Soji Shimada, mystery novelist
 Yuko Shimizu, designer of Hello Kitty
 Ryoko Suzuki, contemporary artist
 Keita Takahashi, game designer
 Yellow Tanabe, manga artist
 Yukinori Yanagi, contemporary artist
 Akimi Yoshida, manga artist

Teachers 
 Taku Aramasa, photographer
 Seiichi Hishikawa, filmmaker, art director, and photographer
 Yurie Nagashima, photographer
 Yoshiharu Sekino, cultural anthropologist

Undifferentiated 

 Yoshihiko Wada, painter

References

External links 
 Official website 
 Official website 

 
1962 establishments in Japan
Art schools in Japan
Educational institutions established in 1962
Kodaira, Tokyo
Private universities and colleges in Japan
Universities and colleges in Tokyo